Tulsidas Balaram (30 November 1936 – 16 February 2023), also known as Tulsidas Balaraman, was an Indian footballer. Balaram represented India in multiple international tournaments, including the Asian Games, the Mederka Cup and the Olympics. Along with P. K. Banerjee and Chuni Goswami, Balaram was part of an acclaimed trio of players that helped propel India into what is widely regarded as its golden age of football during the 1950s and 1960s.

Balaram made his mark playing football for the East Bengal of Kolkata, and captained the team in 1961–62. He predominantly played as a center or left-wing forward In 1962, he received Arjuna Award from the Government of India.

He retired after playing for eight years due to a tuberculosis diagnosis at the age of 27.

Early life
Balaram was born on October 4, 1936 in Ammuguda, a village near Secunderabad in British-occupied Hyderabad. Despite being born into poverty, Balaram showed interest in football from a young age. He recalls getting his first pair of football boots by convincing a cobbler to repurpose an old pair of torn police shoes. When he was 19, he was encouraged by Syed Abdul Rahim to try out for the Hyderabad team for the 1956 Santosh Trophy. Rahim provided Balaram with a monthly allowance for a bicycle so that he could commute from his village to practice in Hyderabad.

Club career
Balaram first played for the Hyderabad team in the 1956 Santosh Trophy. He scored against Bombay in the final, contributing to Hyderabad's 4-1 championship win. 

After the 1956 Melbourne Olympics, Balaram joined the East Bengal Club in Kolkata, eventually going on to serve as team captain. With East Bengal, Balaram won several titles including the 1958 IFA Sheild and the Santosh Trophy in 1959, 1960, and 1962. During his days in East Bengal, Balaram played under coach Sushil Bhattacharya. In the 1959 CFL season, he finished as second highest goalscorer with 23 goals.

International career
Balaram played a total of 36 matches for India and scored 10 goals in international tournaments.

Olympic Games
Balaram was recruited to the India national team for the 1956 Melbourne Olympics and made his international debut against Yugoslavia. Balaram and the Indian team finished in 4th place in 1956, marking India's best-ever finish in football at the Olympic games.

At the 1960 Summer Olympics in Rome, Balaram was responsible for 2 out of 3 Indian goals throughout the tournament. India were placed in the so-called "group of death", with Hungary, France, and Peru. They started the competition against Hungary, losing the game 2–1, with Balaram scoring India's first goal in the tournament at the 79th minute.  Although they lost, the resulting score added to India's credibility within the group stage as the Hungarians beat Peru and France 6–2 and 7–0, respectively. India almost upset 1958 World Cup semi-finalists France a few days later, with Balaram playing a pivotal role in the 1–0 lead deep into second half.  Balaram was the Indian team's only scorer in their final match of the tournament, a 3–1 loss to Peru.

Asian Games
During the 1958 Asian Games in Tokyo, India's match against Hong Kong went into extra time after the scoreline was 2–2 during normal time. Despite an injury, Balaram assisted with two goals and scored one as India won 5–2.

One of the more popular and widely recognized moments in his career came when India won the gold medal at the 1962 Asian Games in Jakarta. Balaram played every game and scored two goals, one each against Thailand and Japan. This marked the first and only time India has come in first place for football at the Asian games.

Coaching career
As coach of Calcutta Mayor's XI, Balaram played a part in bringing up players like Basudev Mandal and Sangram Mukherjee. When a youth team under his coaching got an invitation to play in Germany, his visa was denied by Indian Govt.  His team eventually played in Berlin, remaining unbeaten in four games.  Balaram also worked as advisor of the Dum Dum Municipality's Kingston–Nikhil Nandy Football Academy.

Reception and legacy 

Indian sports journalist Ajay Basu described Balaram as a "superb inside forward". Basu further praised Balaram's improvisation, industriousness and ability to hit curling shots, stating that "while Chuni Goswami had more flair in his play, Balaram had more variety and versatility."

Former Indian international defender Arun Ghosh described Balaram as a man who had "two eyes on the back of his head" due to the high quality of his ball distribution. He was also the central figure of his teams, directing most attacking moves.  

Balaram, known for having a strong partnership with Chuni Goswami and P. K. Banerjee, is considered one of the "Indian football's holy trinity". 

Balaram retired from playing in 1963 due to a tuberculosis diagnosis.

Later life and death
Balaram was a resident of Uttarpara, Hooghly. On 26 December 2022, he was admitted to a hospital in Kolkata with abdominal distension and other age-related problems. Balaram died on 16 February 2023, at the age of 86.

International statistics

Selected international goals

Honours

India
Asian Games Gold medal: 1962
Merdeka Tournament runner-up: 1959

East Bengal
IFA Shield: 1958

Hyderabad
 Santosh Trophy: 1956–57
Bengal
 Santosh Trophy: 1958–59, 1959–60, 1962–63

Bengal Nagpur Railway
 IFA Shield: 1963
 Rovers Cup: 1964

Individual
 Arjuna Award: 1962
Calcutta Football League top scorer: 1961
 Banga Bibhushan: 2013

See also

List of East Bengal Club captains
History of the India national football team
India national football team at the Olympics

References

Bibliography
 Ghosh, Shyam Sundar (September 2022), Balaram: The Hero of Indian Football.

External links
 
 Tulsidas Balaram – EBFC at Twitter

1936 births
2023 deaths
Indian footballers
People from Secunderabad
Footballers from Hyderabad, India
India international footballers
East Bengal Club players
Asian Games medalists in football
Footballers at the 1958 Asian Games
Footballers at the 1962 Asian Games
Association football wingers
Association football forwards
Asian Games gold medalists for India
Olympic footballers of India
Footballers at the 1956 Summer Olympics
Footballers at the 1960 Summer Olympics
Medalists at the 1962 Asian Games
Recipients of the Arjuna Award
Calcutta Football League players